Frank M. Canton (born  Josiah Horner, September 15, 1849September 27, 1927) was an American Old West fugitive who had a career as a deputy U.S. marshal under an assumed name. Although an ex-sheriff stock detective in Wyoming, Canton and his associates were accused of operating more by assassination than the law.  Extrajudicial measures such as the lynching of Ellen Watson inflamed public opinion against the long-established big ranchers Canton worked for, and to re-establish control over grazing they funded an all-out assault on those small operators considered to be rustlers. Canton directed Frank Wolcott's imported gunmen in their planned vigilante campaign, known as the Johnson County War, which was quickly ended by a local posse. Finding himself a marked man in Wyoming, Canton considered it opportune to leave the state. He spent most of the rest of his working life in law enforcement for the court of hanging judge Isaac Parker.

Biography

Early life
Josiah Horner was born on September 15, 1849, in Harrison Township, Henry County, Indiana and drifted into Texas working as a cowboy. In 1871, he started robbing banks and rustling cattle, which at the time was a capital offense. On October 10, 1874, Horner got into a gunfight with some Buffalo Soldiers, killing one and wounding the other. In 1877, he was arrested for robbing a bank in Comanche, Texas. He escaped from Texas Ranger custody and fled to Ogallala, Nebraska, and took up ranching under the alias Frank M. Canton.

Johnson County War
Elected sheriff of Johnson County, Wyoming in 1885, he was seen as a strong right hand of the cattle barons, and the tone of a letter from the Pinkerton Agency recommending Tom Horn to Canton confirms that he took a very hard line against rustling suspects. He served for four years, but resigned after the foreman of the one of the big ranches suspiciously escaped his custody. Although still working part-time as a U.S. Deputy Marshal, rumours circulated he was as much paid assassin and intimidator as detective. The unsolved shooting dead of a law abiding homesteader who had said Canton threatened his life because he had evidence against Canton's friends as culprits in an earlier murder made him distrusted by the homesteading faction. With a mob forming, Canton was arrested, but several big ranchers stood surety for him and his lawyer got him released, whereupon he left the state. By the time further evidence against him was found he was in Illinois, and the matter was dropped.

During the Johnson County War, Canton returned as local guide for Frank Wolcott's largely Texan hirelings who were to execute a death list of alleged rustlers Canton had drawn up. On April 9, 1892, Canton led the so-called Regulators to the "KC Ranch", where their number one targets Nate Champion (a witness against some of Canton's friends for a murder) and Nick Ray were staying. Ray was shot and killed in the opening minutes of the ensuing gunbattle. Champion killed at least four of the Regulators and wounded others. At 5:00 p.m., Canton set the house on fire. Champion burst out of the house firing his Winchester rifle and was shot 28 times. Two days later a huge posse, led by Sheriff Angus surrounded the Regulators at the "TA Ranch" and only the U.S. Cavalry's arrival rescued Canton and his companions from having to surrender. With the newspapers portraying them in a favourable light due to the influence of powerful ranching interests, Canton like the other regulators was freed. He again put several hundred miles between him and Wyoming, this time for good.

Life in Oklahoma
Continuing in law enforcement  Canton traveled to what is now Oklahoma, and as a Deputy U.S. Marshal  based out of Fort Smith, Arkansas, he worked with other famous lawmen such as Heck Thomas, Chris Madsen, Bass Reeves and Bill Tilghman in the Indian territories. In 1895, Canton joined a posse that tracked down Bill and John Shelley, who had escaped from the Pawnee jail and barricaded themselves in a cabin across the Arkansas River. After 5 hours and more than 800 shots fired, Canton sent a burning wagon into the cabin, and the outlaws surrendered.

On November 6, 1896 in Pawnee, Oklahoma, Canton shot dead Bill Dunn in the street. As Canton told it, Dunn said "Damn you, Canton. I've got it in for you!" before reaching his pistol, which got caught in his suspender while Canton drew and fired hitting Dunn in the head and  killing him instantly. If this truly happened, it would be one of the very few examples of an incident resembling a Western film-style fast draw shooting actually occurring; the local law enforcement that Canton worked with ruled it self-defense.

Later life
In 1897, Canton went to Alaska to follow the gold rush, but his work as a Deputy U.S. Marshal ended in disputed circumstances with assertions he had misused public money. He returned to the states in 1907 and became Adjutant General for the Oklahoma National Guard.  Canton confessed that he was Horner, and the Governor of Texas granted him a pardon.

End of life
By 1925, age had visibly overtaken Canton. He had grown bald, his vision was impaired and light-sensitive and he had almost completely lost his hearing. Unable to perform as a cattleman or a lawman, he was then unemployed. The Texas Cattlemen's Association awarded him a small pension. His unmarried adult daughter, Ruby, helped support Canton and his wife, Annie, moved into Ruby's home. On September 1, 1927, he could not get out of bed, so Ruby summoned a doctor. After examining the patient, the doctor announced that he had terminal cancer and would have to remain in bed, since he had only a few days to live. On September 15, the family celebrated his seventy-eighth birthday at Ruby's home. Canton died on September 27, 1927, in Edmond, Oklahoma.

Dramatic representations
 Canton is played by Sam Waterston in Heaven's Gate (1980). He is portrayed, however, as a senior cattle baron, rather than a detective and lawman.
 Canton is the basis for Jesse Jacklin in the 2002 television movie Johnson County War.
 Canton, played by Ed Nelson, is a guest character in the "What Happened at the XST?" episode (1972) of Alias Smith and Jones.
 Canton was Owen Wister's direct inspiration for "The Virginian".

References

Bibliography
 Canton, Frank M., (1930). - Frontier Trails: The Autobiography of Frank M. Canton. - Edited by Edward Everett Dale. - Boston, New York: Houghton Mifflin. - .
Reprint: 1966. - Norman, Oklahoma: University of Oklahoma Press. - .
 DeArment, Robert K. (1996), Alias Frank Canton. Norman, OK: University of Oklahoma Press.

External links
 Gunslinger.com
 Frank Canton
 Wyoming tales and trails
 El Buscaderos-Cowboy Action Shooting-Feature at www.netw.com
 thewildest.org
 Legends of America
 Encyclopedia of Oklahoma History and Culture - Canton, Frank
 by Karl Smallwood

1849 births
1927 deaths
American bank robbers
American cattlemen
Contract killers
Cowboys
Fugitives
Farmers from Indiana
Farmers from Wyoming
Gunslingers of the American Old West
Lawmen of the American Old West
Outlaws of the American Old West
People from Henry County, Indiana
People from Johnson County, Wyoming
People from Ogallala, Nebraska
Recipients of American gubernatorial pardons
United States Marshals